Sharon Ann Hunt (born 11 October 1977 in Bury St Edmunds) is a British three-day eventing rider.

Hunt was educated at Culford School and the Perse School for Girls.  With her horse Tankers Town, she was fifth at Badminton Horse Trials then she won the bronze medal for Great Britain in the team eventing at the 2008 Summer Olympics in Beijing.

In the spring of 2006 Hunt was 6th at badminton horse trials with Tankers Town. This gained her a place as an individual at the World Equestrian Games, in Aachen, Germany, where she finished 9th.

In June 2010, Sharon Hunt and Tankers Town won the 2010 Luhmühlen Horse Trials (CCI 4*).

External links 
 Athlete bio at 2008 Olympics site

English female equestrians
Equestrians at the 2008 Summer Olympics
British event riders
People educated at Culford School
Olympic bronze medallists for Great Britain
Olympic equestrians of Great Britain
British female equestrians
Sportspeople from Bury St Edmunds
1977 births
Living people
Olympic medalists in equestrian
People educated at the Perse School for Girls
Medalists at the 2008 Summer Olympics